Medirigiriya Vatadageya is a Buddhist structure (Vatadage) in Medirigiriya, Sri Lanka. It was built during the Anuradhapura era.

3D Heritage Documentation 
The Zamani Project, document cultural heritage sites in 3D to create a record for future generations. The documentation is based on terrestrial laser-scanning. The 3D documentation of the Vatadage in Medirigiriya was carried out in 2019. 3D models, a Panorama tour, plans and images can be view here.

See also
 Polonnaruwa Vatadage
 Vatadage
 Thiriyaya vatadage

References

Archaeological protected monuments in Polonnaruwa District
Tourist attractions in North Central Province, Sri Lanka
Vatadages